James Paxton (born February 23, 1994) is an American actor. He is known for co-starring in the USA Network drama series Eyewitness as Lukas Waldenbeck. He also starred in the music video for Matt Maeson's "Beggar's Song". He is the son of actor Bill Paxton, and played a younger version of his father's character John Garrett in Agents of S.H.I.E.L.D.

Filmography

References

External links 
 

1994 births
21st-century American male actors
American male film actors
American male television actors
American people of Austrian descent
American people of Dutch descent
American people of English descent
American people of French descent
American people of German descent
American people of Norwegian descent
American people of Scotch-Irish descent
American people of Scottish descent
American people of Swiss descent
American people of Welsh descent
Living people
Male actors from California
People from Ojai, California